George H. W. Bush, a Republican from Texas, was elected President of the United States on November 8, 1988 and was inaugurated as the nation's 41st president on January 20, 1989, and his presidency ended on January 20, 1993 with the inauguration of Bill Clinton. The following articles cover the timeline of Bush's presidency:

 Pre-presidency: 1987–1989
George H. W. Bush 1988 presidential campaign
Presidential transition of George H. W. Bush
 Presidency: 1989–1993
Timeline of the George H. W. Bush presidency (1989)
Timeline of the George H. W. Bush presidency (1990)
Timeline of the George H. W. Bush presidency (1991)
Timeline of the George H. W. Bush presidency (1992–January 1993)
Post-presidency of George H. W. Bush

See also
 Timeline of the Ronald Reagan presidency, for his predecessor
 Timeline of the Bill Clinton presidency, for his successor

Bush, George H. W.
Presidency of George H. W. Bush